Blockout is a puzzle video game published in 1989 by California Dreams. It was developed in Poland by Aleksander Ustaszewski and Mirosław Zabłocki. American Technos published an arcade version. Blockout is an unlicensed, 3D version of Tetris.

Gameplay

The player's perspective is that of looking down into a three-dimensional rectangular pit. Polycube blocks of various shapes appear, one at a time, and fall slowly toward the bottom of the pit. The player can use three buttons to rotate the block around any of the three coordinate axes, and can also maneuver the block horizontally and vertically with a joystick. Once any part of a block comes to rest on the floor of the pit or in contact with an already-placed cube, the entire block freezes in place and can no longer be moved. The player can press a button on the joystick to quickly drop a block. Once a solid layer of cubes is formed with no gaps (a "face"), it disappears and all cubes above it drop toward the bottom of the pit to fill the space. Completing multiple faces with a single block awards higher scores, and the player earns a "Block Out" bonus for completely emptying the pit. A set number of faces must be completed in order to end each round.

As the game progresses, the blocks begin to drop faster, the dimensions of the pit change from round to round, and differently-shaped blocks begin to appear. A bonus stage is played after every fifth round, in which the player has 30 seconds to form as many faces as possible in a 2x2 pit. The game ends if the blocks stack up to the top of the pit, with the exception of the bonus stages; in the latter case, the stage ends immediately and the player advances to the next round.

The game allows head-to-head competition between two players, each of whom has their own pit and blocks. When one player completes a face, all the cubes in the opponent's pit are raised by one level. A player can win a round by either being the first to complete a set number of faces or by forcing their opponent's cubes to stack up to the top of the pit. The first player to win a set number of rounds may continue the game alone in single-player mode.

Ports
Apart from the other known console ports of Blockout, there were also two for NES: the first is an official unreleased prototype developed in 1990 by Technos Japan Corp. under the name "Block Out", while the second is an unauthorized clone programmed by Hwang Shinwei and published by both himself and RCM Group in 1989/1990 (titled 3D Block).

Blockout was ported to the Virtual Boy as 3D Tetris (March 22, 1996), though the game suffers greatly from the lack of colors beyond red and black.

Reception

The New York Times reviewed the game in an article about educational software for mathematics, writing that Blockout "doesn't pretend to be educational, but the skills required to master it are not unrelated to mathematics, particularly geometry." A 1993 study found evidence that playing Blockout improved the spatial visualization ability of 10- to 14-year-olds. 

In Japan, Game Machine listed Block Out on their March 1, 1990 issue as being the tenth most-successful table arcade unit of the month.

Dragon gave the game's Atari Lynx version a perfect score. Robert A. Jung reviewed the Atari Lynx version of the game which was published to IGN. In his final verdict he wrote "This is a nice, addictive, no-nonsense strategy game. Without any patterns to memorize and several options to choose from, Blockout will keep its freshness for quite some time. If you thought Tetris was too simple, give this title a try." Scoring the game 8 out of 10.

Entertainment Weekly gave the game an A, deeming it the #17 greatest game available in 1991.

Legacy
Around 2007 a modernized, authorized continuation/remake named Blockout II was released with a license from Kadon Enterprises, to use the trademarked Blockout name. The game is open-source and was ported to many platforms the original wasn't available before, like Microsoft Windows, Ubuntu, and the OpenPandora handheld.

In 2021, a web browser-based version written in JavaScript and HTML5 was released. It is officially licensed to use the name Blockout.

References

1989 video games
Falling block puzzle games
Amiga games
Arcade video games
Apple IIGS games
Commodore 64 games
Sega Genesis games
Atari Lynx games
Cancelled Nintendo Entertainment System games
Atari ST games
DOS games
Classic Mac OS games
Linux games
Multiplayer and single-player video games
California Dreams (publishing label) games
Open-source video games
Video games developed in Poland
Tetris clones